Parthenina clathrata is a species of sea snail, a marine gastropod mollusk in the family Pyramidellidae, the pyrams and their allies.

Distribution
This marine species occurs in the following locations:
 European waters (ERMS scope)
 Greek Exclusive Economic Zone
 Irish Exclusive economic Zone
 Portuguese Exclusive Economic Zone
 Spanish Exclusive Economic Zone
 United Kingdom Exclusive Economic Zone

References

 Gofas, S.; Le Renard, J.; Bouchet, P. (2001). Mollusca, in: Costello, M.J. et al. (Ed.) (2001). European register of marine species: a check-list of the marine species in Europe and a bibliography of guides to their identification. Collection Patrimoines Naturels, 50: pp. 180–213
 van der Linden J. & Eikenboom J.C.A. (1992) On the taxonomy of the Recent species of the genus Chrysallida Carpenter from Europe, the Canary Islands and the Azores. Basteria 56: 3-63. [15 June 1992]
 Peñas A. & Rolán E. (1998). La familia Pyramidellidae Gray, 1840 (Mollusca, Gastropoda) en África Occidental. 3. El género Chrysallida s.l. Iberus,  suppl. 4 : 1-73.

External links
 To World Register of Marine Species

Pyramidellidae
Molluscs of the Atlantic Ocean
Molluscs of the Mediterranean Sea
Gastropods described in 1848